The 2022 Maia Challenger was a professional tennis tournament played on clay courts. It was the fifth edition of the tournament which was part of the 2022 ATP Challenger Tour. It took place in Maia, Portugal from 28 November to 4 December 2022.

Singles main-draw entrants

Seeds

 1 Rankings are as of 21 November 2022.

Other entrants
The following players received wildcards into the singles main draw:
  Fábio Coelho
  João Domingues
  Gonçalo Oliveira

The following player received entry into the singles main draw using a protected ranking:
  Pedro Sousa

The following players received entry into the singles main draw as alternates:
  Vitaliy Sachko
  Louis Wessels

The following players received entry from the qualifying draw:
  Raphaël Collignon
  Denis Istomin
  Evgeny Karlovskiy
  Alexandar Lazarov
  Maximilian Neuchrist
  Gauthier Onclin

Champions

Singles

  Luca Van Assche def.  Maximilian Neuchrist 3–6, 6–4, 6–0.

Doubles

  Julian Cash /  Henry Patten def.  Nuno Borges /  Francisco Cabral 6–3, 3–6, [10–8].

References

2022 ATP Challenger Tour
November 2022 sports events in Portugal